Mountain Lake Park Historic District is a national historic district in Mountain Lake Park, Garrett County, Maryland. It consists of a group of 145 buildings lying within the town, which was launched in the 1880s as a summer resort and important as a center of the Chautauqua movement in Maryland. The district still includes many of the houses built by summer residents of town in the late 19th and early 20th centuries, built in various interpretations of the "Country Gothic" or Rural Queen Anne styles. Also within the district are several of the educational and recreational buildings constructed by the Mountain Lake Park Association, the Methodist-led group which owned and managed the town for many years after its founding in 1881.

It was added to the National Register of Historic Places in 1983.

References

External links
, including photo dated 1988, at Maryland Historical Trust
Boundary Map of the Mountain Lake Park Historic District, Garrett County, at Maryland Historical Trust
 Mountain Lake Park, Western Maryland's Historical Library

Historic districts in Garrett County, Maryland
Historic districts on the National Register of Historic Places in Maryland
Chautauqua
National Register of Historic Places in Garrett County, Maryland
1983 establishments in Maryland